Hayk Ordyan (Armenian: Հայկ Օրդյան, December 3, 1978, Yerevan), Armenian director, producer.

Biography 

Hayk Ordyan was born in 1978 in Yerevan. From 1996-2001 he studied in Armenian State Pedagogical University after Khachatur Abovian (Faculty of Culture). Since student years he worked in the Public Television of Armenia. Over the years, he was the director of news and documentary projects on Armenian TV channels. Since 2011, as a director, he has collaborated with various international TV channels, where he mainly shoots documentaries. From 2008-2016 he has lectured in the Armenian State Pedagogical University after Khachatur Abovian and in Russian-Armenian (Slavonic) University. From 2019, he has been teaching at the Yerevan State Institute of Theatre and Cinematography. Since 2019, he has been the founder and director of the production company ORDER FILM, where he makes feature and documentary films.
In 2021, the premiere of the director's movie “Zulali” took place in Yerevan, which later achieved international success, winning many awards.

Filmography

Documentary
 “Anonymous Graves” (2004)
 “The Story of Armenian Wine” (2005)
 “Frunzik Mkrtchyan: Life on Tape” (2007)
 “The Poet of Cinema: Artavazd Peleshyan” (2009)
 “Edward Ghazaryan: Miracle Worker”, (2012)
 “Codes of Our Body” (2013)
 “Eyesight Without Eyes”, (2014)
 “Genocide: The Beginning” (2015)
 “The Keepers of Leopard Land” (2015)

Feature
 “Agony” (short, 2014)
 “Zulali” (2021)

References 

Living people
1978 births
Armenian film directors
Armenian documentary filmmakers
Armenian film producers
Armenian screenwriters